The Board of Intermediate and Secondary Education was formed in 1961 in the city of Hyderabad, Sindh to facilitate examinations for high schools and higher secondary schools (also called intermediate colleges).

History
A commission on national education was appointed on 30 December 1958 which recommended the four years of education from grade IX to XII as part of the intermediate and secondary education curricula thus forming the Board of Intermediate and Secondary Education in Hyderabad in 1961.

The move came as part of the West Pakistan Intermediate and Secondary Education Ordinance, 1961 (alternatively for East Pakistan, it was the East Pakistan Ordinance No. XXXIII of 1961). The ordinance was further amended in Act no. XVI of 1962 and Act no. XVII of 1977. Under the acts, it was responsible for the organization to regulate, supervise, control and develop the levels and status of Intermediate and Secondary level public examinations in educational institutions.

The board started acting under the guidance of Dr G. A. Jafri, appointed as the board's chairman. Soon afterwards, the board was further bifurcated into a board for Sukkur and recently for Mirpur Khas.

Administration
The board is run by a group of directors who appoint a chairperson (currently Dr Muhammad Memon), a secretary (currently ) and a controller (Dr.Masroor Ahmed Zai).

Organisation
As an organisation, the board has developed in the recent years a 202 members strong staff and is equipped with offices in Latifabad U8. The board also owns a stadium in Latifabad used for league, inter-club and -city hockey tournaments. But sporting events  The District Hockey Association (DHA) for the Hyderabad District, Pakistan had allocated a budget of 1.6 million rupees for renovations for the betterment of hockey arenas but were reluctant to give the board their share. However, recent endeavours towards bringing the National Hockey Championship back to Hyderabad have been welcomed by quite a few government officials.
Recently enough the 54th National Hockey Championships were brought to the stadium and the DHA officials pronounced better conditions.

See also 
 List of educational boards in Pakistan
 Board of Intermediate Education, Karachi
 Board of Secondary Education, Karachi
 Board of Intermediate and Secondary Education, Lahore
 Board of Intermediate and Secondary Education, Faisalabad
 Board of Intermediate and Secondary Education, Rawalpindi
 Board of Intermediate and Secondary Education, Multan
 Board of Intermediate and Secondary Education, Gujranwala
 Board of Intermediate and Secondary Education, Sargodha

References

External links
 Official website

Education boards in Sindh